This is a list of the top 50 singles in 2004 in New Zealand.

Chart
Key
 – Song of New Zealand origin

Notes

External links
 Top selling singles of 2004, RIANZ Top40 website

2004 in New Zealand music
2004 record charts
Singles 2004